Max Meyer may refer to:
 Max Meyer (baseball) (born 1999), American baseball player
 Max Meyer (footballer) (born 1995), German footballer 
 Max Friedrich Meyer (1873–1967), German-born American psychologist
 Max Meyer-Olbersleben (1850–1927), German composer and pianist
 Max Meyer (cycling team)

See also
 Max Mayer (disambiguation)
 Max Meier (born 1936), Swiss boxer